South Carolina Highway 760 (SC 760) is a  state highway in the U.S. state of South Carolina. The highway travels through eastern Columbia, and connects the main part of the city with Fort Jackson. It is known as Fort Jackson Boulevard for its entire length.

Route description
SC 760 begins at an intersection with U.S. Route 76 (US 76) and US 378 (Devine Street) and the eastern terminus of the central segment of unsigned US 76 Conn. (Cross Hill Road) in Columbia, Richland County. This intersection is just northeast of Midlands Technical College's Beltline Campus. It travels to the east-northeast and crosses over Gills Creek. A short distance later, it intersects the eastern terminus of the unsigned eastern segment of US 76 Conn. (Wildcat Road). It then meets an interchange with Interstate 77 (I-77; William Earle Berne Beltway). A short distance later, it reaches its eastern terminus, a crossing over Wildcat Creek. Here, the roadway continues as Fort Jackson Boulevard, crosses over Wildcat Creek, and enters Fort Jackson.

Major intersections

See also

References

External links

SC 760 South Carolina Hwy Index

760
Transportation in Richland County, South Carolina
Transportation in Columbia, South Carolina